WXIN (channel 59) is a television station in Indianapolis, Indiana, United States, affiliated with the Fox network. It is owned by Nexstar Media Group alongside Bloomington-licensed CBS affiliate WTTV, channel 4 (and its Kokomo-licensed satellite WTTK, channel 29). Both stations share studios on Network Place (near 71st Street and I-465) in northwestern Indianapolis, while WXIN's transmitter is located on West 73rd Street (or Westlane Road) on the northern outskirts of the city.

History

Prior history of UHF channel 59 in Central Indiana
The allocation would become occupied by CBS affiliate WFAM-TV (now WLFI-TV), which original owner Sarkes Tarzian (who also founded WXIN's present-day sister station WTTV) signed on in June 1953. After that station moved its allocation to UHF channel 18 in 1957, UHF channel 59 would remain dormant until the Federal Communications Commission (FCC) later reassigned the allotment to Indianapolis.

WXIN station history
In the late 1970s, the FCC began taking applications for channel 59 in Indianapolis, receiving four, from Indianapolis Television Corporation; Channel 59 of Indiana; United Television Corporation of Indiana (owned by United Cable); and Indianapolis 59 (subsidiary of a young Sinclair Broadcast Group). Indianapolis Television Corporation secured the channel in a joint settlement, reimbursing its competitors a combined $128,300 in the process.

The new construction permit, initially held by Indianapolis Television—a consortium of shopping mall and Indiana Pacers co-owner Melvin Simon, his brother Fred, and Gerald Kraft—took the call letters WSMK and was initially planned as a subscription television operation, but the expansion of cable TV made such operation impractical by 1983. That year, 80 percent of the stock in the company was sold to locally based computer services company Anacomp, Inc.; Melvin retained 10 percent, while his other brother, Herbert Simon, bought a 10 percent stake. The $800,000 acquisition produced capital to be invested in the construction of the station. Anacomp was headed by Ron Palamara, while one of the vice presidents in Anacomp was Chris Duffy, who had been the general manager at WTHR for five years before joining Anacomp in 1981. The reconfigured ownership group changed channel 59's call letters to WPDS-TV, after Palamara, Duffy and Simon's initials.

Palamara had promised the station would be on air by New Year 1984; due to weather delays, that turned into the Chinese New Year when WPDS-TV signed on February 1, 1984. Originally operating as an independent station, channel 59 maintained a general entertainment programming format featuring cartoons, movies, classic sitcoms and drama series. Through Simon's part-ownership of the station, it also aired Indiana Pacers NBA games in the 1984–85 season. The station originally operated from studios located at 1440 North Meridian Street in Indianapolis' Television Row section, a facility that had previously been occupied by WFYI until it moved to a larger building across the street. WPDS' primary competitor was the market's established independent, WTTV (channel 4, now a CBS affiliate) in Bloomington; it would gain another competitor when WMCC (channel 23, now MyNetworkTV affiliate WNDY-TV) signed on November 1, 1987. Palamara, Duffy and Simon sold the station to Outlet Broadcasting (through its Atlin Communications subsidiary) in 1985. The station's call letters were then changed to the current WXIN on August 10 of that year, a decision not precipitated by the ownership change but by a desire to avoid confusion (particularly in ratings diaries) with the similar-sounding cable channel WTBS and PBS. The station lost the Pacers broadcast rights after the sale, with the telecasts returning to WTTV for the 1985-86 season.

As a Fox affiliate (1986–present)
WXIN became a charter affiliate of the Fox Broadcasting Company when the network launched on October 9, 1986, after WTTV—despite its status as one of the strongest independent stations in the country—turned down an offer to become an affiliate. As was the case with other Fox stations during the network's early years, channel 59 was still programmed as a de facto independent station, as Fox initially ran prime time programs only on weekends and would not offer nightly programming until September 1993. Until then, WXIN aired a movie at 8:00 p.m. on nights when network programs did not air. The station began identifying as "Fox WXIN 59" by 1988 (simply adding the Fox name to the "WXIN 59" branding in use since 1985), which was simplified to "Fox 59" in 1991; it also added more sitcoms to its inventory, and eventually began to overtake WTTV in the ratings. Outlet sold WXIN along with WATL in Atlanta to Chase Broadcasting in December 1989; Chase subsequently merged with Renaissance Broadcasting in 1993.

Chicago-based Tribune Broadcasting bought Renaissance's television properties for $1.13 billion on July 7, 1996. Under Tribune ownership, WXIN gradually added more talk shows, reality series and court shows to its schedule. By that time, WXIN carried the weekday afternoon edition of the Fox Kids block from 2:30 to 4:30 p.m., before moving it one hour earlier (from 1:30 to 3:30) in 1999; Fox discontinued the Fox Kids weekday block in December 2001, though WXIN continued to carry the remaining Saturday morning lineup (which was relaunched FoxBox in September 2002, and was later branded as 4Kids TV from September 2005 until December 2008, when Fox discontinued its children's programming after declining to renew its agreement with time-lease partner 4Kids Entertainment).

Tribune acquired WTTV and its Kokomo satellite WTTK (channel 29) from the Sinclair Broadcast Group on April 29, 2002; this created the market's first television duopoly under current FCC regulations with WXIN when the purchase was finalized on July 24 (Sinclair – which had ironically considered acquiring WXIN and the other Renaissance stations in 1996 – had briefly owned WTTV and WIIB (channel 63, now Ion Television owned-and-operated station WIPX-TV) from 1996 to 1998 under a cross-ownership waiver as the FCC had prohibited duopolies at the time). While an affiliation swap should have been expected given that WTTV was a VHF station that had been on the air much longer than UHF outlet WXIN, and WXIN had an established news department whereas WTTV had been outsourcing its newscasts since 1990, Tribune kept the WB affiliation on WTTV and Fox programming on WXIN due to the fact that WTTV had a weaker signal in the northern parts of the market as its transmitter was located farther south than other area stations, requiring WTTK to relay its programming. Additionally since Fox holds the broadcast television rights to the National Football Conference, the network only airs Indianapolis Colts regular season games (at least two per season) in which the NFL team plays against an NFC opponent (with most other games airing on WISH-TV (channel 8) at the time through American Football Conference rightsholder CBS; however, starting in 2014, any games that are moved from WISH or WTTV to WXIN will air on channel 59, via the new 'cross-flex' broadcast rules), so Fox did not consider Indianapolis an important market for getting a VHF affiliate (incidentally, WXIN carried Colts-related analysis programs including head coach Tony Dungy's discussion program from 2006 to 2008, assuming the rights from and later losing them to WISH-TV and WNDY-TV).
In 2004, WXIN relocated its operations from its Meridian Street studio to a new facility at 6910 Network Place at the Intech Park office development on the city's northwest side (as a result, both it and WTTV are the only major network affiliates in Indianapolis whose studios are not located within the Television Row section).

In 2011, WXIN and WSJV in South Bend became the only full-power Fox affiliates in Indiana to carry the network's programming on their primary channels, after Fox programming was relegated to digital subchannels of Big Three-affiliated stations in three markets due to a dispute between the network and the Nexstar Broadcasting Group over reverse compensation of retransmission consent fees that led to Nexstar's Evansville and Fort Wayne stations (WTVW and WFFT-TV) being stripped of their Fox affiliations, and its Terre Haute station (WFXW, now WAWV-TV) dropping the network to rejoin ABC (WFFT-TV rejoined Fox on March 1, 2013, after Nexstar settled a 2011 lawsuit against Granite Broadcasting citing undue control of five major network affiliations on Granite's virtual duopoly in Fort Wayne at the time – ABC and The CW on WPTA and NBC, Fox and MyNetworkTV on WISE-TV). As a result of fellow charter affiliate WFFT-TV losing its Fox affiliation, WXIN became the longest-tenured Fox affiliate in the state of Indiana. On January 1, 2015, WXIN became the second largest Fox affiliate (behind WRAZ in Raleigh, North Carolina) owned in a duopoly with a "Big Three" station when WTTV switched from The CW to CBS; it is also the only station in Indianapolis to have never changed its network affiliation.

Sale to Nexstar Media Group
After a failed attempt by Sinclair Broadcast Group to acquire Tribune Media, Nexstar Media Group—which had subsumed Media General's WISH and WNDY in 2017—announced in December 2018 that it would acquire the company. Due to FCC ownership rules and scrutiny, Nexstar was required to divest two of the stations: the company ultimately elected to sell WISH and WNDY to the owner of Bayou City Broadcasting, in favor of retaining WTTV and WXIN. The sale was completed on September 19, 2019.

Programming
In addition to the Fox network schedule, syndicated programming on WXIN includes The Drew Barrymore Show, Steve Wilkos, Maury, TMZ on TV and Daily Mail TV.

In September 2013, WXIN became the flagship station for the Hoosier Lottery, whose Daily 3 and Daily 4 evening drawings are held at the station's Network Place studios, and air nightly at 10:58 after the 10:00 p.m. newscast (the station had already been airing drawings for Powerball on Wednesdays and Saturdays, and Mega Millions on Tuesdays and Fridays, which now air after the Hoosier Lottery telecasts on those nights). Ironically, sister station WTTV (which carried the drawings since 1998 through a deal with then-rightsholder, ABC affiliate WRTV (channel 6) had lost the rights to the televised drawings after the Indiana State Lottery Commission discontinued them due to budget cuts and began conducting the drawings at its offices using a random number generator in 2001.

Channel 59 also airs select Indianapolis Colts telecasts, as part of Fox's National Football Conference package. Shortly before WTTV switched to CBS, the team announced a deal with Tribune Broadcasting that made WXIN and WTTV official broadcast partners. This means both stations will air Colts preseason games, team programming and coach's show beginning in the summer of 2015, though a majority of the games will air on WTTV, owing to CBS' AFC rights. Advertising within Lucas Oil Stadium is also included in the deal. Additionally, both stations carried the Super Bowl from 2019 to 2021, with WTTV carrying CBS coverage of Super Bowl LIII, WXIN airing Fox's coverage of Super Bowl LIV and CBS airing Super Bowl LV. (CBS and NBC switched Super Bowl coverage in 2021 and 2022; this was so that NBC would not have to worry about airing the Winter Olympics (which begin nine days before Super Bowl LVI) against CBS' coverage of the Super Bowl. Thus, CBS aired Super Bowl LV in 2021 and NBC will air Super Bowl LVI in 2022.) The only time the Colts would not play on a Tribune station would be if they were scheduled for an NBC Sunday Night Football telecast, which would air on WTHR, or ESPN's Monday Night Football, which has traditionally aired on WRTV. Beginning in 2018, the Thursday Night Football telecast games are aired on WXIN, due to Fox carrying the package as part of a contract lasting through 2022.

News operation

WXIN presently broadcasts 62½ hours of locally produced newscasts each week (with 10½ hours each weekday and five hours each on Saturdays and Sundays, which includes IN Focus airing Sundays at 9:30 a.m. and Indy Sports Central Overtime airing Fridays and Sundays at 10:35 p.m.). Currently WXIN itself (excluding sister station WTTV) has the second largest local newscast output in Indianapolis and the state of Indiana. Combined with WTTV, Nexstar's Indianapolis duopoly broadcasts 88 hours of local news. Prior to 2017, WXIN had the largest local newscast output in both the Indianapolis market and the state. That changed with WISH-TV expanding to about 77 hours of local programing, coupled with the cancellations of FOX59 NewsPoint @ 11 on weekends. The sports highlight program Indy Sports Central Overtime is retitled Fast Break Friday or Football Friday Night on Fox during the high school basketball and football seasons.

News department history
Local newscasts debuted on channel 59 the day it started operations as WPDS-TV on February 1, 1984, with an hour-long 10:00 p.m. newscast, titled 59 Headline News; it was co-anchored by Ann Craig and Ken Owen, who later served as an anchor at WISH-TV, WANE and WRTV. Unable to compete with WTTV's longer-established prime time newscast in the ratings (which itself was canceled with the November 1990 shutdown of channel 4's news department), the program was cancelled in the fall of 1984. For the next six years, channel 59's news programming consisted solely of 60-second news and weather updates, branded as WXIN News Extra, that aired during commercial breaks within the station's daytime and evening programming.

Long-form newscasts returned in September 1991 after Chase Broadcasting restarted a news department for WXIN, which began producing a nightly 35-minute newscast at 10:00 p.m. Debuting as Fox 59 Nightcast – which was later retitled Fox News at 10 in 1994 and then to Fox 59 News at Ten in 1997, it was first anchored by Bob Donaldson (who remained WXIN's lead anchor until January 2016, when he moved exclusively to sister station WTTV, with which he had been serving as its primary weeknight co-anchor since it joined CBS in January 2015) and Caroline Thau, alongside chief meteorologist Chris Wright (who left in 1994, and was replaced by current chief Brian Wilkes) and sports director (and former ABC Sports commentator) Brian Hammons. WXIN grew to become the ratings leader in the 10:00 p.m. timeslot, even with competition from a WRTV-produced newscast on WTTV (which began shortly before the start of WXIN's second prime time news effort, and was canceled in December 2002 after Tribune acquired WTTV) and WTHR's late newscast – which moved from 11:00 p.m. to 10:00 on April 7, 1991 as part of a short-lived "early prime time" network scheduling experiment; more competition sprang up when then-WB affiliate WNDY-TV debuted the WTHR-produced Eyewitness News at 10:00 on March 16, 1996, which briefly moved to WIPX-TV when WISH-TV took over production of the WNDY newscast (as 24-Hour News 8 at 10:00) on February 28, 2005.

WXIN expanded news programming outside its established 10:00 slot on March 29, 1999, when it premiered Fox 59 a.m. Formatted as a mix of news, entertainment and lifestyle features with a looser, "personality-driven" style inspired by morning radio programs, the show initially aired from 6:00 to 9:00 a.m., replacing paid programming and children's programs that had previously aired in that time period. The program was reformatted as a more traditional morning newscast in 2004, and grew to beat competing local and national morning news programs in the 25-54 age demographic. The station expanded the flagship 10:00 p.m. newscast to one hour on April 17, 2006; until that point, WXIN had been among the largest news-producing Fox affiliates by market size that did not air an hour-long prime time newscast, either on a nightly basis or on weeknights only.

In May 2007, WXIN entered into a content partnership with the Indianapolis Business Journal to provide news and weather content for the newspaper. On January 2, 2008, WXIN added an hour onto its morning newscast from 5:00 to 6:00 a.m., expanding it to four hours; a simulcast of the 6:00 to 9:00 a.m. block of the program began airing on WTTV on that date (the WTTV simulcast later moved to that station's This TV-affiliated digital subchannel on September 13, 2010, before being dropped in September 2013). The station debuted a half-hour midday newscast at 11:00 a.m. nine months later on September 15.

Under the direction of now-former general manager Jerry Martin and his successor Larry Delia, and former news director Lee Rosenthal, WXIN spearheaded a major expansion of its news programming. On September 21, 2009 (as other Tribune-owned Fox affiliates began to increase their news output, which the network had encouraged its stations to do since the 1990s), the station expanded its weekday morning newscast to 4½ hours with the addition of a half-hour at 4:30 a.m., and premiered an hour-long 4:00 p.m. newscast. On November 1, 2009, WXIN became the fourth television station in the Indianapolis market to begin broadcasting its local newscasts in high definition; with the change, WXIN adopted the logo and graphic scheme used by Fox's owned-and-operated stations and certain affiliates (including some of its sister stations under Tribune ownership). On WXIN, this Fox graphics scheme and corresponding music package was already in use in some aspects (though the music package was used in all aspects) since 2006. The 11:00 a.m. newscast was dropped on January 1, 2010; WXIN then added an hour to its weekday morning newscast from 9:00 to 10:00 a.m. on January 4.

WXIN launched Indysportsnation.com in April 2009; in addition, the station debuted a weekend evening sports program that month, IndySportsNation Overtime (which replaced another highlight show, Fox 59 Sports Weekender), and sports segments during the station's newscasts were rebranded under the "IndySportsNation" banner. Morning newscasts expanded again on August 21, 2010, with the debut of three-hour weekend editions from 6:00 to 9:00 a.m. (as a result, WXIN became Tribune's first television station, since an attempt by its Chicago flagship WGN-TV for a few years during the 1990s, to carry a weekend morning newscast); three weeks later on September 13, the station debuted an hour-long weeknight 5:00 p.m. newscast. The weekend morning newscasts expanded to four hours on January 8, 2011, with the addition of a 9:00 a.m. hour; this was followed on January 10, 2011, with the expansion of its weekday morning newscast to six hours with the addition of a half-hour at 4:00 a.m.

WXIN furthered its evening news expansion on September 10, 2012, when it debuted an hour-long weeknight 6:00 p.m. broadcast. On June 15, 2013, WXIN implemented a standardized graphics package for Tribune's Fox affiliates that originated on Grand Rapids sister station WXMI in November 2012. On June 23, 2014, WXIN entered into a multi-year content partnership with The Indianapolis Star – which began on August 1, replacing WTHR – to collaborate on coverage of news reports and investigative reports, with WXIN also providing weather forecasts for the newspaper. On June 30, 2014, the station debuted a half-hour nightly 11:00 p.m. newscast, titled Fox 59 NewsPoint at 11, a program packaged as a standalone newscast serving as a wrap-up of the day's headlines; this was followed on September 22, 2014 by the launch of a half-hour weeknight 7:00 p.m. newscast. These particular additions had increased the station's weekly news total to 66 hours (beating Cleveland sister station WJW for the largest local news output of any major U.S. television station). WXIN's 7:00 p.m. newscast competes with an existing newscast on ABC affiliate WRTV (which predates the WXIN program by seven years). In late 2017, the weekend editions of the 11 p.m. newscast were cancelled and replaced by FOX's late night programming on Saturdays, moving from 11:30 p.m. to its original start time of 11 p.m., as it once was prior to the launch of the 11 p.m. newscast and being replaced by repeat episodes of The Simpsons on Sunday nights.

When sister station WTTV announced that upon its switch to CBS it would launch a separate news operation from WXIN with its own on-air staff (similar to, though also differing in structure from the shared news operation of St. Louis sister duopoly KTVI/KPLR-TV, the latter of which maintains separate anchors from KTVI for certain newscasts), WTTV/WXIN became the first known duopoly (legal or virtual) involving a Big Three affiliate and a Fox station, in which the two stations maintain separate news departments and newscasts in competing timeslots (the presence of two separate, but jointly based news departments controlled by one company structured in this manner is more common with duopolies involving stations affiliated with two of the Big Three networks). Both stations' news departments are housed out of their shared facility on Network Place, and – while it does hinder both stations – each produce newscasts that compete in most traditional timeslots, except on weekend mornings (as WTTV carries the CBS Dream Team lineup), weekdays at noon and weekends at 6:00 p.m. (as WXIN airs syndicated programming in both periods, with sports programming periodically airing in the latter slot on either station). There is also a considerable amount of sharing between WTTV and WXIN in regards to news coverage, video footage and the use of reporters; though both outlets maintain their own primary on-air personalities (such as news anchors and meteorologists) that only appear on their respective station (Bob Donaldson is a notable exception as he anchors newscasts on both stations, remaining as lead anchor of channel 59's 10:00 p.m. newscast but transferring his 6:00 p.m. duties from WXIN to WTTV following the CBS switch). On May 3, 2015, WXIN debuted IN Focus, a half-hour Sunday morning program focusing on political and civic issues (the Sunday morning newscast was concurrently reduced by a half-hour in order to make room for the program).

Notable current on-air staff
 Lindy Thackston – weekday morning anchor

Notable former on-air staff
 Aishah Hasnie – investigative reporter (2011–2019; now at Fox News
 Catt Sadler – entertainment reporter and co-host of Hoosier Millionaire (later host of The Daily 10 on E!; now correspondent for E! News)
 Sara Snow – weekday morning reporter (formerly host of Get Fresh With Sara Snow on Discovery Health)

Technical information

Subchannels
The station's digital signal is multiplexed:

Former affiliations
 59.3 - This TV (until November 1, 2019)

Analog-to-digital conversion
WXIN shut down its analog signal, over UHF channel 59, on June 12, 2009, the official date in which full-power television stations in the United States transitioned from analog to digital broadcasts under federal mandate. The station's digital signal continued to broadcast on its pre-transition UHF channel 45. Through the use of PSIP, digital television receivers display the station's virtual channel as its former UHF analog channel 59, which was among the high band UHF channels (52-69) that were removed from broadcasting use as a result of the transition.

References

External links

 
 Indianapolis.ThisTV.com - WXIN-DT3 ("This TV Indianapolis") official website
 
 WPDS opening sign-on on YouTube

Fox network affiliates
Antenna TV affiliates
Court TV affiliates
Charge! (TV network) affiliates
Mass media in Indianapolis
Nexstar Media Group
Television channels and stations established in 1984
1984 establishments in Indiana
XIN